The 2002 V8 Supercar Championship Series was an Australian based motor racing series for V8 Supercars. It began on 15 March 2002 at the Adelaide Street Circuit and ended on 1 December at Sandown International Raceway after 13 rounds. It was the fourth V8 Supercar Championship Series but the first to carry that name, previous championships having been contested as the "Shell Championship Series". The winner of the Drivers Championship, Mark Skaife, was also awarded the 43rd Australian Touring Car Championship.

Teams and drivers
The following drivers and teams competed in the 2002 V8 Supercar Championship Series. The series consisted of 11 sprint rounds with one driver per car and two endurance rounds (the VIP Petfoods Queensland 500 and the Bob Jane T-Marts Bathurst 1000) with each car shared by two drivers.

 – Ross Halliday was the entered co-driver, but was replaced prior to race start with Peter Doulman.

Team Changes
Holden Young Lions returned to the series after a year absence. They signed Rick Kelly as the Main Driver and Nathan Pretty for the Enduro Rounds.
Glenn Seton Racing scaled down to a one car team.
00 Motorsport scaled up to a Three Car Team with Neil Crompton joining the team on a full-time basis.
Perkins Engineering scaled up to a Three Car Team with Steven Richards joining the team after a year with Glenn Seton Racing.
Brad Jones Racing scaled up to a Two Car Team with John Bowe joining the team after two years with Briggs Motor Sport.
Briggs Motor Sport expanded to a three car team.

Driver Changes
Rick Kelly graduated to the Supercars Championship with Holden Young Lions
Steven Richards left Glenn Seton Racing to join Perkins Engineering
John Bowe left Briggs Motor Sport to join Brad Jones Racing
Tony Longhurst left Rod Nash Racing to join Briggs Motor Sport
Craig Baird returned to the Supercars Championship replacing Tony Longhurst at Rod Nash Racing.
Neil Crompton joined 00 Motorsport on a full time basis.

Race calendar

The 2002 V8 Supercar Championship Series consisted of 13 rounds which included 11 sprint rounds of two or three races and two single race endurance rounds.

Points system
Championship points were awarded according to the follow table.

In rounds 9 & 10 points were split equally between drivers sharing the car, each being awarded half the number of tabled points for the round.

Championship results

Drivers Championship

Champion Team of the Series
Champion Team of the Series was won by the Holden Racing Team, which was awarded the title as the team of the winning driver.

Champion Manufacturer of the Series 
Champion Manufacturer of the Series was won by Holden Limited, which was awarded the title as the manufacturer with the most round wins.

See also
 2002 V8 Supercar season

Notes

References

External links
 Official V8 Supercar site
 2002 Drivers Championship Points Standing at www.v8supercar.com.au, as archived at web.archive.org

Supercars Championship seasons
V8Supercar Championship Series